Bulbostylis fluviatilis is a species of plant in the family Cyperaceae first described by Robert Kral and Gerrit Davidse.  No subspecies are listed in the Catalogue of Life.

References

fluviatilis